TradeStation Group, Inc. is the parent company of online securities and futures brokerage firms and trading technology companies. It is headquartered in Plantation, Florida, and has offices in New York; Chicago; Richardson, Texas; London; Sydney; and Costa Rica. TradeStation is best known for the technical analysis software and electronic trading platform it provides to the active trader and certain institutional trader markets. TradeStation Group was a Nasdaq GS-listed company from 1997 to 2011, until acquired by Monex Group, a Tokyo Stock Exchange listed parent company of one of Japan's leading online securities brokerage firms.

History
TradeStation was founded by Cuban-born brothers William (Bill) and Rafael (Ralph) Cruz, who sought to create a way to design, test, optimize, and automate their own custom trading strategies. Bill started studying trading at the age of 16, and two years later, the brothers pooled $2,400 to open a futures trading account. They gathered trading data to create charts, which were used to test trading ideas. Bill began to test strategies himself without the benefit of formal coding knowledge, a process that resulted in the development of EasyLanguage, the company's proprietary coding language for non-specialists.

Bill and Ralph decided to start their own company, then known as Omega Research. The brothers focused on selling tools that would give clients without a technical or computer programming background the ability to program and test their own trading strategies. In 1987, they released System Writer, a software product that enabled users to develop and “back-test” their own trading ideas using historical market data. In 1989, System Writer Plus was released with new and innovative charting features, which the publication Commodity Trader Consumer Reports likened to “the system trading software equivalent of putting a man on the moon.”

In 1991, Omega Research released TradeStation and, three years later, struck a licensing deal with Dow Jones Telerate to offer TradeStation as a premium service to Telerate's institutional clients worldwide. In 1997, Omega Research conducted an IPO and became listed on the Nasdaq National Market. The company launched an online version of its product in 1999. In 2001, the company converted itself from a trading software company to an online securities brokerage, and renamed itself “TradeStation”. The software's back-testing, order-generation and trade execution capabilities were fully integrated for both securities and futures markets in 2003. In 2004 and 2005, TradeStation became a self-clearing equities and options firm. An entire industry eventually grew up around TradeStation's software, including seminars, publications, and user networks.

 1982 - Company is formed under the name Omega Research, Inc.
 1991 - TradeStation, the company's flagship product, is launched.
 1996 - OptionStation, an options trading analytics product that enables traders to explore complex options trading strategies, is launched.
 1997 - The company launches an initial public offering (IPO) and is listed on the Nasdaq National Market.
 1999 - RadarScreen®, a software application that enables traders to scan hundreds of symbols to identify buy and sell opportunities based on the user's custom criteria, is launched; the company also acquires Window On WallStreet and in 2000 launches WindowOnWallStreet.com, the company's first Internet-based charting and analytics service.
 2000 - TradeStation 6, the Internet-based trading platform that serves as the foundation of the company's direct-access brokerage service, is launched; the company also acquires a direct-access securities brokerage, Onlinetrading.com, which is subsequently renamed TradeStation Securities, Inc.
 2001 - TradeStation Group replaces Omega Research as publicly-traded Nasdaq company as a parent of two operating subsidiaries – TradeStation Securities, Inc. (formerly onlinetrading.com) and TradeStation Technologies, Inc. (formerly Omega Research); trading symbol on Nasdaq is changed from OMGA to TRAD.
 2006 - TradeStation Europe Limited (now TradeStation International Ltd) receives approval from the United Kingdom's Financial Conduct Authority (FCA) as an introducing broker.
 2011 - TradeStation Group is acquired by Japan's Monex Group;

Corporate structure
TradeStation Group, Inc.’s principal operating subsidiaries are TradeStation Securities, Inc. and TradeStation Technologies, Inc. TradeStation Group is a wholly owned subsidiary of Monex Group, Inc., one of Japan’s largest online financial services providers.

TradeStation Securities, Inc. is a member of the New York Stock Exchange (NYSE), Financial Industry Regulatory Authority (FINRA), Securities Investor Protection Corporation (SIPC), Depository Trust & Clearing Corporation (DTCC), Options Clearing Corporation (OCC) and the National Futures Association (NFA). It is a licensed securities broker-dealer and a registered futures commission merchant, and is also a member of the Boston Options Exchange, Chicago Board Options Exchange, Chicago Stock Exchange, International Securities Exchange and NASDAQ OMX. The company’s technology subsidiary, TradeStation Technologies, Inc., develops and offers strategy trading software tools and subscription services. Its London-based subsidiary, TradeStation International Ltd, a Financial Services Authority authorized brokerage firm, introduces the UK and other European accounts to TradeStation Securities, Inc.

Monex Group, Inc. provides online investment and trading services for retail and institutional customers around the world through its subsidiaries, including Monex, Inc. in Japan, TradeStation in the U.S., and Europe, and Monex Boom in Hong Kong. Monex Group is pursuing its “Global Vision” strategy to establish a truly global online financial institution that creates positive synergies for all stakeholders.

Its main subsidiary, Monex Inc., one of Japan's largest online securities brokerages, provides advanced and unique financial services to its nearly one million individual investors. Monex Group's services also cover M&A advisory, debt and equity underwriting, asset management focusing on alternative investments, investment education, and other investment banking functions in Japan.

TradeStation analysis and trading platform
The TradeStation analysis and trading platform is a professional electronic trading platform for financial market traders. It provides extensive functionality for receiving real-time data, displaying charts, entering orders, and managing outstanding orders and market positions. Although it comes with a large number of pre-defined indicators, strategy components, and analysis tools, individuals can modify and customize existing indicators and strategies, as well as create their own indicators and strategies using TradeStation's proprietary object-oriented EasyLanguage programming language. Traders can also access hundreds of TradeStation-compatible products created by independent third-party developers through the TradeStation TradingApp Store, as well as access strategy trading ideas submitted by the TradeStation community in the EasyLanguage Library.

TradeStation supports the development, testing, optimizing, and automation of all aspects of trading. Trading strategies can be back-tested and refined against historical data in simulated trading before being traded "live". TradeStation can be used either as a research and testing tool or as a trading platform with TradeStation Securities or IBFX acting as the broker.

Add-on products
A large number of third-party developers develop TradeStation-compatible products. Since Tradestation is a development platform, a custom trading program can be developed called a trading system or trading strategy. If any trader has an analysis technique or potentially profitable strategy he would like to have developed, he can either write his own strategy in EasyLanguage or have his trading system developed by third-party developers. Traders can also take advantage of the TradeStation TradingApp Store, an online marketplace of ready-to-use add-on products built to run on the TradeStation platform by independent developers.

References

External links
 

Technical analysis software
Online brokerages
Foreign exchange companies
Electronic trading platforms
American companies established in 1982
Financial services companies established in 1982
1982 establishments in Florida
Companies based in Broward County, Florida
Plantation, Florida
1997 initial public offerings
2011 mergers and acquisitions
American subsidiaries of foreign companies
Online financial services companies of the United States